"Never Had a Lot to Lose" is a song by the American rock band Cheap Trick, which was released in 1989 as the fifth and final single from their tenth studio album Lap of Luxury (1988). It was written by lead vocalist Robin Zander and bassist Tom Petersson, and produced by Richie Zito. The song reached No. 75 on the Billboard Hot 100.

Background
Recalling the writing of the song, Petersson stated in the Cheap Trick biography Reputation is a Fragile Thing that he and Zander "sat down [and] did a track. We put the lyrics together as we were doing it in a demo studio. That was fun."

Music video
The song's music video was directed by Jim Yukich and produced by Paul Flattery for FYI. It achieved medium rotation on MTV.

Critical reception
Upon its release, Billboard listed the song as a recommended single under the "Pop" category and described it as a "lively power rocker" and a "definite highlight" from Lap of Luxury.

In a review of Lap of Luxury, Ira Robbins of Trouser Press described the song as "durable" and one of the album's few bright spots. Steve Huey of AllMusic considered it a "catchy hard rocker." In the 1998 Cheap Trick biography Reputation Is a Fragile Thing, authors Mike Hayes and Ken Sharp call the song a "gem" and "an up-tempo commercial rocker, featuring a classic Cheap trick riff". They highlighted it as possibly the best song on Lap of Luxury. In the 2007 book Shake Some Action - The Ultimate Guide to Power Pop, author John M. Borack described it as the "crown jewel of the record".

Track listing
7-inch single (US and Australia)
"Never Had a Lot to Lose" - 3:22
"All We Need is a Dream" - 3:40

Personnel
Cheap Trick
 Robin Zander - lead vocals, rhythm guitar
 Rick Nielsen - lead guitar, backing vocals
 Tom Petersson - bass, backing vocals
 Bun E. Carlos - drums, percussion

Production
 Richie Zito - producer
 Phil Kaffel - engineer, mixer
 Jim Champagne, Bernard Frings, Mike Tacci, Bob Vogt, Toby Wright - second engineers

Charts

References

1988 songs
1989 singles
Cheap Trick songs
Songs written by Robin Zander
Songs written by Tom Petersson
Song recordings produced by Richie Zito
Epic Records singles